Thomas Scot (or Scott; died 17 October 1660) was an English politician  who sat in the House of Commons at various times between 1645 and 1660. He was executed as one of the regicides of King Charles I.

Early life 
Scot was educated at Westminster School and is said have attended  Cambridge University. In 1626 he married Alice Allinson of Chesterford in Essex. He was a lawyer in Buckinghamshire and grew to prominence as the treasurer of the region's County Committee between 1644 and 1646. He became influential enough to dominate the Committee and was elected Member of Parliament for Aylesbury in 1645 as a recruiter to the Long Parliament. Though he had a penchant for long, passionate speeches in Parliament, Scot could also be a subtle backroom politician and had a knack for creating alliances and rallying votes. A royalist acerbically described him as one who "crept into the House of Commons, whispers Treason into many of the Members ears, animating the War, and ripping up and studying aggravations thereunto."

Political career 
Scot's beliefs about government by consent prior to Pride's Purge are hard to gauge, though from what has survived of his writings and speeches many historians have described him as being republican. His actions during the Purge period definitely indicate that he developed strong republican leanings before 1648.

From the beginning of the English Civil War, Scot was a strong supporter of tough terms with King Charles I and later became a vociferous opponent of the Treaty of Newport, declaring "that there could be no time seasonable for such a treaty, or for a peace with so perfidious and implacable a prince; but it would always be too soon, or too late. He that draws his sword upon the king, must throw his scabbard into the fire; and that all peace with him would prove the spoil of the godly."

After Pride's Purge, Scot became one of the chief organizers of the trial and execution of the King. Scot was instrumental in the erection of the Republic and along with Henry Vane, Oliver Cromwell and Arthur Heselrige became one of its primary leaders.

Trial and execution 

In 1653, with the fall of the Republic, Scot became one of the Protectorate's most vocal opponents, organising anti-Cromwell opposition inside the Parliament. In 1654 he was elected MP for Wycombe in the First Protectorate Parliament. He was elected MP for Aylesbury again in 1656 for the Second Protectorate Parliament In 1659, he was elected MP for Wycombe again in the Third Protectorate Parliament and then sat for Aylesbury again in the restored Rump Parliament.

Like all of the other 59 men who signed the death warrant for Charles I he was in grave danger when Charles II of England was restored to the throne. He fled to Flanders, but surrendered at Brussels. He was put on trial, found guilty and hanged, drawn and quartered on 17 October 1660 for the crime of regicide.

Thomas Scot was brought to trial on 12 October 1660 (in the opinion of Edmund Ludlow the outcome was a foregone conclusion).  He was charged with sitting in the High Court of Justice at the trial of King Charles I and with signing one warrant for summoning that court, and another for the execution. He was further accused of wanting "Here lies Thomas Scot, who adjudged the late King to die" on his gravestone.

Many witnesses were produced to prove these things; and among them William Lenthal, Speaker in the Long Parliament, who, when the King entered the House of Commons in 1641, and had demanded of him the Five Members, had answered "that he had neither ears to hear, eyes to see, or mouth to speak except what the House gave", now appear for the prosecution; affirming in Court, that Scot, had justified proceeding against the Charles in the House of Commons.

In his defence, Scot said that whatever had been spoken in the House ought not to be given in evidence against him, not falling under the cognisance of any inferior court, as all men knew: that for what he had done in relation to the King, he had the authority of the Long Parliament for his justification and that this Court had no right to declare whether that authority were a Parliament or not; and being demanded to produce one instance to show that the House of Commons was ever possessed of such an authority, he assured them he could produce many. But having begun with the Saxon times, he was interrupted by the Court, and told that the things of those ages were obscure.

Scot then moved on to a second defence that:

He was interrupted by the Court in mid sentence; and John Finch said (according to Ludlow with passion):

Scot replied:

To which Francis Annesley answered, that: 

These, with many other things of equal force were presented by Scot in his defence, not so much in the expectation that the jury would find him innocent, but to justify his actions to the country and posterity. As all expected the jury was directed to find him guilty.

At his execution some of his last words were "I say again; to the Praise of the Free Grace of God; I bless His name He hath engaged me in a Cause, not to be Repented of, I say, Not to be Repented of".

See also 
 List of regicides of Charles I

Notes

References

Further reading

1660 deaths
People executed by Stuart England by hanging, drawing and quartering
Executed regicides of Charles I
Executed English people
Year of birth unknown
People educated at Westminster School, London
Alumni of the University of Cambridge
English MPs 1640–1648
English MPs 1648–1653
English MPs 1654–1655
English MPs 1656–1658
English MPs 1659
English politicians convicted of crimes